Hyblaea synaema is a moth in the family Hyblaeidae. It is found in 
Queensland, Australia.

References

Moths described in 1902
Hyblaeidae